Seungduk Kim (born in Seoul, Korea & lives and works in Paris, France) is a curator & exhibition organizer in the field of contemporary art.
She is currently working for Le Consortium in Dijon (Burgundy, based in Paris) as co-director and associate curator.
Seungduk Kim was selected as Commissioner of the Korean Pavilion for the 55th Venice Biennale in 2013.
She was in charge with Franck Gautherot – for Le Consortium – of the artistic direction in Asia Culture Center (ACC in Gwangju, South Korea) in 2014 to 2016, for space design and public art programs. Kim Seung-duk was made Chevalier de l’ordre des Arts et des Lettres by the Ministry of  Culture of the Government of France,  in July 2022.

« We expect art to be a tool for understanding our situation in history,
our role in society, our mission for the future
and our desire to stay in the memory of our children. »
- Le Consortium

Biography 

Seungduk Kim left Korea after graduate high school in 1973 and has lived abroad for most of her life.

Educated in New York, she got a M.A. in Art History at Hunter College of New York (May 1990), and a M.A. in French Language & Civilization at New York University (February 1984). She is graduated of Université Paris 1-Panthéon-Sorbonne in art history and archeology, and holder of a D.E.A. in Art History (October 1998).

Career 

Between 1993 and 2000, Kim Seung-duk worked for the Samsung Foundation of Art and Culture (now Leeum, Samsung Museum of Art) as a consulting curator based in Venice and Paris. For three years she was also associate curator in the Collection department of the Centre Pompidou (Paris), between 1996 and 1998.

From 2000 till now, Seungduk Kim, as co-director and International Project Director / Development in Asia, collaborates with late Xavier Douroux(1956-2017), Franck Gautherot, Eric Troncy along with Anne Pontégnie and Stéphanie Moisdon at Consortium museum (Before Consortium contemporary art center). Le Consortium, founded in 1977, is a contemporary art center based in Dijon (France), which includes a publishing house (Les Presses du Réel), an exhibitions office with an interest in organising shows across genres, a film production company (Anna Sanders Films).

From October 2011 to 2017, Kim Seung-duk was committee member of programming for the Palais de Tokyo in Paris. She was also project director / art consultant (with Le Consortium) on an overall public art strategy for an urban development in Doha (Qatar) from June 2011 to 2014.

From Autumn 2014 to 2016, Kim Seung-duk and Franck Gautherot, one of the original founders of Le Consortium, were in charge of the artistic direction in ACC (Asia Culture Center in Gwangju, South Korea) for space design and public art programs.

In May 2015, on the occasion of the 56th Venice Biennale opening, Kim Seung-duk initiates with Le Consortium, le Silencio and the Palazzo Grassi, "The Venetian Blinds", first of a concert series by visual artists who are also musicians. 

In 2016, the workshop ‘Art & Culture master planning’ (October 4 - 7, in Seoul, Korea) was co-organised by the KAMS (Korea Arts Management Service) under the directing le Consortium, Seungduk Kim & Franck Gautherot.

Selected exhibitions as curator or co-curator 
 Jill Mulleady, Blood fog, curated by Franck Gautherot & Seungduk Kim, Le Consortium, Dijon (France), July 7 2021 - January 9, 2022 
  Grancey-le-Château, A World at the Edge, Consortium-Land, Venice Biennale of Architecture (in collaboration with Patrick Berger, Junya Ishigami, Aristide Antona), May 22 - November 21, 2021
 Pattern, Crime & Decoration, curated by Franck Gautherot & Seungduk Kim in collaboration with Lionel Bovier and MAMCO Genève, Le Consortium, Dijon (France), May 16 -  October 20 2019 / MAMCO, Geneve (Swiss),  Octobre 10, 2018 - February 3, 2019
 L’Almanach 18, Le Consortium, Dijon (France), June 22 - October 14, 2018
 From Vietnam To Berlin, curated by Seong Won Kim & Seungduk Kim &  Franck Gautherot, Asia Culture Center (Gwangju), South Korea, March 9 - July 8 2018
 Jay Defeo : The Ripple Effect, curated by Franck Gautherot & Seungduk Kim, Le Consortium, February 3 - May 20, 2017. This exhibition traveled to Aspen Museum of Art (Colorado, US), June 29 - October 28, 2018
 L’Almanach 16, Le Consortium, Dijon (France), 2016
 Han Mook & Lee Ungno : Two Korean modernist painters in Paris, Le Consortium, Dijon (France), 2015-2016
 Kimsooja, To Breathe : Bottari, Korean Pavilion, 55th Venice Biennale (Italy), June 1 – November 24, 2013
 Jurgen Teller : Touch me, Daelim Contemporary Art Museum, Seoul (Korea), 2011
 Lynda Benglis, Le Consortium, Dijon (France) and 5 other museums (Van Abbe museum, IMMA, RISD, New Museum, Museum of Contemporary Art, Los Angeles), 2010
 Yayoi Kusama : Mirrored Year, Boijmans Van Beuningen Museum Rotterdam (Netherlands), Museum of Contemporary Art Sydney (Australia), City Gallery Wellington (New Zealand), 2008
 On Kawara : Pure Consciousness, one of a series of ten kindergarten projects, Yonghwa Kindergarten, Yonghwa Temple, Tongyeong (Korea), 2008
 The 2nd Anyang Public Art Project 2007, Anyang (Korea), 2007
 Yayoi Kusama : Dots Obsession ? Love Transformed into Dots, Haus der Kunst Munich, (Germany), 2007
 Elastic Taboos : Within the Korean World of Contemporary Art, Kunsthalle Wien, Vienna (Austria), 2007
 Execution : Exhibition of YanPei-Ming, Saint-Etienne Museum of Modern Art, Saint-Etienne (France), 2006
 Thoughts of a Fish in the Deep Sea, Valencia Biennale, Valencia (Spain), 2005
 Domicile : Prive/public, Saint-Etienne Museum of Modern Art, Saint-Etienne (France), 2005
 Flower Power, Lille 2004 exhibition projects, European Cultural Capital City, Palais des Beaux-Arts de Lille, Palais Rameau, Lille (France), 2004
 Wang Du : Disposable Reality, Rodin Gallery, Seoul (Korea), 2003
 Yayoi Kusama, Le Consortium, Dijon (France), Maison de la culture du Japon, Paris (France), Kunsthallen Brandts Klaedefabrik, Odense (Denmark), Les Abattoirs, Toulouse (France), Kunsthalle Wien, Vienna (Austria), Art Sunje Seoul & Kyungju (Korea), 2000-2003
 Kim Sooja & Yan Pei Ming : Self-scape, Kunsthalle Brandts Klaedefabrik, Odense (Denmark), 2000-2001
 Asiana : Contemporary Art from the Far East, Palazzo Vendramin Calergi, Venice (Italy), 1995
 Triennale Kleinplastik 1995 : Europa-Ostasien, SudwestLB Forum, Stuttgart (Germany), 1995

Publications 

Seungduk Kimʼs numerous publications including reviews and essays about international art, architects and designers. She writes series of articles in art magazines like Art in Culture, Beaux Arts Magazine, Frog Magazine, Art Press, Quarterly Magazine...

External links 
 Le Consortium, Dijon (France), Instargram @le_consortium
 Les Presses du Réel
 Anna Sanders Films
 Msheireb Downtown Doha Project
 Korean Pavilion 2013 in Venice
 Les Nouveaux Commanditaires
 Frog Magazine
 Instargram Kim seung-duk @sdkim1209

References 

South Korean artists
Living people
Year of birth missing (living people)
South Korean curators
South Korean women curators